Neebing is a municipality in the Canadian province of Ontario, located in the Thunder Bay District immediately south of the city of Thunder Bay. It is part of Thunder Bay's Census Metropolitan Area.

History

Neebing comprises the former geographic townships of Blake, Crooks, Pardee, Pearson and Scoble. It was incorporated in its current form on January 1, 1999. It should not be confused with the geographic township of Neebing, which was amalgamated into the City of Thunder Bay in 1970.

The Municipality of Neebing was incorporated in 1881 by the Legislative Assembly of Ontario. It included Neebing township, Neebing Additional township, Blake, Crooks and Pardee townships. In 1892 all of Neebing Additional township and a large portion of Neebing township was removed to form the City of Fort William. In 1970 the remainder of Neebing township was also removed from the Municipality of Neebing, leaving it with only the name.

Geography
Little Trout Bay

Communities

The municipality includes the communities of Cloud Bay, Jarvis River, Moose Hill, Scoble West and Wamsley.

Demographics 

See also
List of townships in Ontario

References

External links 

Municipalities in Thunder Bay District
Single-tier municipalities in Ontario